Gorilla is the first Japanese extended play from South Korean boy band Pentagon. It was released on March 29, 2017, by Cube Entertainment. The album contains six tracks, consisting of four Japanese-language versions of songs from their previous EPs Pentagon and Five Senses (including the title track "Gorilla") and two original songs.

Track listing

Charts

References 

2017 debut EPs
Pentagon (South Korean band) EPs
Cube Entertainment EPs
J-pop EPs